Jay Sidney MacDowell (September 14, 1919 – June 15, 1992) was an American football player who played tackle and end  for six seasons for the Philadelphia Eagles.

References

External links

1919 births
Players of American football from Illinois
American football wide receivers
Washington Huskies football players
Philadelphia Eagles players
1992 deaths